Chandrasiri is a Sinhalese surname. It is also a male given name.

Notable people

Given name
 Chandrasiri Gajadeera (1946–2019), Sri Lankan politician
 Chandrasiri Kodithuwakku (1949–2016), Sri Lankan actor
 Sarath Chandrasiri Mayadunne, Sri Lankan politician
 Sarath Chandrasiri Muthukumarana, Sri Lankan politician
 Sugath Chandrasiri Bandara (died 2009), Sri Lankan army officer

Surname
 G. A. Chandrasiri, Sri Lankan army officer
 Jayantha Chandrasiri (born 1959), Sri Lankan journalist
 Sarath Chandrasiri, Sri Lankan actor
 Somaweera Chandrasiri (1909–1971), Ceylonese politician
 Vindika Chandrasiri (born 1988), Sri Lankan cricketer

See also
 

Sinhalese masculine given names
Sinhalese surnames